The South Side Lynx (officially the South Side MacDonald's Excavation/EF MacPhee Lynx) are a Canadian Junior C ice hockey team based in Crapaud, Prince Edward Island. They are members of the Prince Edward Island Junior C Hockey League. They are coached by Paul Dawson and play out of the South Shore Actiplex. The Lynx have won the Razzy's PEI Junior C league title on three occasions in 2015, 2016 and 2017.

History

The South Side Lynx were founded in 2009. As with many expansion franchises, they struggled in their early years, never advancing past the first round of the playoffs until season three in 2011–12, where they were eliminated by Pownal Red Devils in the semifinals. 

The Lynx appeared in the league finals for the first time in 2013, losing to Tignish in four games. 

Two years later, in 2014-15 the Lynx won the league title, advancing on to the Maritime-Hockey North Junior C Championship in Charlottetown. They defeated the MU Rhinos of the Nova Scotia Junior Hockey League to advance to the final, where they were defeated by Nunavut's Baffin Blizzard.

After 20 games played in the 2018–19 the team ceased operations due to a lack of healthy players. After sitting out the next season the Lynx returned to the ice for 2020–21.

Season by season

Maritime-Hockey North Junior C Championship

South Side Lynx all-time scoring leaders

See also

 List of ice hockey teams in Prince Edward Island

References

External links
PEI Junior C Website

Ice hockey teams in Prince Edward Island
2009 establishments in Prince Edward Island
Ice hockey clubs established in 2009